Bombus quadricolor is a species of cuckoo bumblebee.

The bumblebee is present in most of Europe except Britain, Ireland, and Iceland. It is also found in Turkey.

References

Bumblebees
Hymenoptera of Europe
Insects described in 1832